Big Girl is a Canadian short film, directed by Renuka Jeyapalan and released in 2005.

The film depicts a battle of wills between a young girl (Samantha Weinstein) and her mother's new boyfriend (Kris Holden-Ried).

It won the Toronto International Film Festival Award for Best Canadian Short Film at the 2005 Toronto International Film Festival, and was nominated for a Genie Award for Best Live Action Short Drama at the 27th Genie Awards. Weinstein won an ACTRA Award for Best Actress from the Toronto chapter, becoming the youngest actress ever to win that award.

It screened on CBC Television's Canadian Reflections in 2006.

References

External links
 

2005 short films
2005 films
Canadian drama short films
English-language Canadian films
Canadian Film Centre films
2000s English-language films
2000s Canadian films
Films directed by Renuka Jeyapalan